Unrepeatable is the title of a performance by British comedian Eddie Izzard. It was filmed on 14 March 1994 at the Albery Theatre, released on VHS and later DVD, and follows her first show, Live at the Ambassadors.

She covers a wide range of topics, including washing routines, cats and dogs, cross dressing, horror movies such as Dracula, and Star Trek, which is typical of her "stream of consciousness" style of comedy.

External links
 Unrepeatable - article at The Official Eddie Izzard Site
 
 Unrepeatable Transcript on Cake or Death fansite

Eddie Izzard albums
Stand-up comedy albums
Spoken word albums by English artists
Stand-up comedy concert films
1994 live albums
1994 video albums
Live video albums
1990s comedy albums